Diana Cristiana Ciucă (born 1 June 2000) is a Romanian handball player for CS Rapid București and the Romanian national team.

In September 2018, she was included by EHF in a list of the twenty best young handballers to watch for the future.

She represented Romania at the 2019 World Women's Handball Championship.

Achievements
Liga Națională:
Winner: 2019, 2022

Supercupa României:
Winner: 2018

Cupa României:
Finalist: 2018

Youth European Olympic Festival:
Silver Medalist: 2017

Individual awards 
 All-Star Goalkeeper of the Youth European Championship: 2017

References

External links

2000 births
Living people
Sportspeople from Craiova
Romanian female handball players 
SCM Râmnicu Vâlcea (handball) players